Sanni Hakala (born 31 October 1997) is a Finnish ice hockey player and member of the Finnish national team, currently playing in the Swedish Women's Hockey League (SDHL) with HV71 Dam.

Playing career    
As a youth player, Hakala played on boys' teams until she was 15, at which point she signed with JYP Jyväskylä in the Naisten SM-sarja, the top flight of Finnish women's hockey. She won the Emma Laaksonen Award for Fair Play in the 2015–16 season.

In November 2016, she left Finland to sign with HV71 in the SDHL. She was named HV71's fan player of the year for the 2019–20 season.

After missing the first third of the 2020–21 SDHL season, she scored a hat-trick in her first game back, a 6-1 victory over Brynäs IF in November 2020.

International play 
She made her senior national team debut at the 2016 IIHF Women's World Championship. She has represented the Finnish national team at the World Championships every year since including the team's first-ever silver medal at the 2019 IIHF Women's World Championship. She scored one goal in six games as Finland won bronze at the 2018 Winter Olympics.

Career statistics

International

See also 
 List of Olympic women's ice hockey players for Finland

References

External links
 
 

1997 births
Living people
Finnish expatriate ice hockey players in Sweden
Finnish women's ice hockey forwards
HV71 Dam players
Ice hockey players at the 2018 Winter Olympics
Ice hockey players at the 2022 Winter Olympics
JYP Jyväskylä Naiset players
Medalists at the 2018 Winter Olympics
Medalists at the 2022 Winter Olympics
Olympic bronze medalists for Finland
Olympic ice hockey players of Finland
Olympic medalists in ice hockey
Oulun Kärpät Naiset players
Sportspeople from Jyväskylä